Francis Harold Harris (1 June 1883 – 26 June 1961) was an Australian rules footballer who played with St Kilda and Melbourne in the Victorian Football League (VFL). In 1913, he was cleared to Essendon Association in the Victorian Football Association (VFA).

Notes

External links 

 

Frank Harris's playing statistics from The VFA Project
Demonwiki profile

1883 births
1961 deaths
Australian rules footballers from Melbourne
St Kilda Football Club players
Melbourne Football Club players
Essendon Association Football Club players
People from St Kilda, Victoria